Beadini is a surname. Notable people with the surname include:

Buran Beadini (born 1955), Yugoslav footballer and manager
Naser Beadini (1962–1992), Yugoslav footballer

See also
Bedini